Dmitri "Misha" Collins (born Dmitri Tippens Krushnic; August 20, 1974) is an American actor best known for his role as the angel Castiel on the CW television series Supernatural (2008–2020).

Early life
Misha Collins was born in Boston, Massachusetts, to Richard Krushnic and Rebecca Tippens. He was raised in an irreligious family. Growing up, his family was poor and often homeless. He has said that his surname, Krushnic, "goes back six generations in Canada, and we're not sure where they came from." His stage name, Collins, is his great-grandmother's maiden name. He is of partial Jewish descent.

Collins attended Greenfield Center School, Northfield Mount Hermon School and the University of Chicago, where he studied social theory.

Career

Interning
Before acting, he interned for four months at the White House during the Clinton Administration in the Office of Presidential Personnel.

Acting
His film work includes an uncredited appearance in the 1999 movie Liberty Heights, as well as roles in Girl, Interrupted; Finding Home;  Karla; and Loot (on which he also served as Associate Producer).

He starred as the angel Castiel on the CW television series Supernatural from 2008-2020. As well as his work on Supernatural, other television shows includes Legacy, Charmed, NYPD Blue, 24, CSI: Crime Scene Investigation, ER, Monk, and Timeless.

He has appeared on several podcasts. He has several guest appearances. For his acting work in podcasts, in 2018, he voiced the role of Adler Harrison in The Angel of Vine produced by Vox Populi. In 2021, he starred as Jeremy Bradshaw as the main role on Bridgewater produced by Grim & Mild.

He hosted Roadfood: Discovering America One Dish at a Time on PBS, a TV show focused on local foods in America.

In 2022, he was cast as Harvey Dent/Two Face in the upcoming Gotham Knights show on the CW.

Writing
Collins is a published poet. His poems, including "Baby Pants" and "Old Bones", can be found in the 2008 edition of Columbia Poetry Review #21.

Collins has also co-written a cookbook, The Adventurous Eaters Club, with his wife, Vicki Collins. It is reported that much of the book's sales will go to charitable organizations who specialize in food nutrition.

Collins and Kathryn Leonard, together with several other collaborators, are authors of "The 2D Shape Structure Dataset", an academic research paper on a crowd-sourced database on the structure of shapes.

Collins's poetry book, Some Things I Still Can’t Tell You, was published on October 12, 2021 and is a full collection of poems at 144 pages. It reached the NYTimes bestseller list.

Charity work
Collins is the co-founder and board president of Random Acts, a non-profit organization dedicated to funding and inspiring acts of kindness around the world. Collins founded the Greatest International Scavenger Hunt the World Has Ever Seen (GISHWHES) in 2011. Entrance fees for the international competition go towards Random Acts, and in 2012, GISHWHES broke the world record for most pledges to perform an act of kindness.

Personal life
On October 6, 2001, Collins married Victoria Vantoch in Maine. They have a son, West Anaximander Collins (born September 23, 2010), and a daughter, Maison Marie Collins (born September 25, 2012).

In April 2022, Collins clarified that he is straight after a fan convention appearance led to reports he had appeared to come out as bisexual.

Filmography

Film

Television

Podcasts 
Acting roles are in bold.

Web

Producer

Director

Awards and nominations

References

External links

 
 
 

1974 births
Living people
Male actors from Boston
American male film actors
American male television actors
People from Greenfield, Massachusetts
Northfield Mount Hermon School alumni
University of Chicago alumni
American people of Canadian descent
American people of Jewish descent
20th-century American male actors
21st-century American male actors
Shorty Award winners